Michalinów  near Trąbczyn is a village in the administrative district of Gmina Zagórów, within Słupca County, Greater Poland Voivodeship, in west-central Poland. It is one of two villages with this name in the district, the other being Michalinów near Oleśnica.

References

Michalinow T